The Chrysanthemum is a cocktail made with absinthe, Bénédictine, and vermouth. The  pre-prohibition cocktail is sometimes credited to 1930 edition of The Savoy Cocktail Book, although an earlier recipe appears in the influential early 20th century cocktail book Recipes for Mixed Drinks (1916) by Hugo R. Ensslin.

Ensslin's original recipe called for equal parts of dry vermouth and Bénédictine; most modern adaptations follow Harry Craddock's recipe of a 2:1 ratio of vermouth to Bénédictine to avoid the sweetness of the latter from overwhelming the drink. Some recipes add lemon juice.

In Jacks manual on the vintage and production, care and handling of wines, liquors, etc from 1933 the historic recipe is made with anisette, instead of absinthe.

See also
Arsenic and Old Lace

References

Cocktails with absinthe
Cocktails with anise-flavored liquors
Cocktails with vermouth